"The Star-Spangled Man" is the second episode of the American television miniseries The Falcon and the Winter Soldier, based on Marvel Comics featuring the characters Sam Wilson / Falcon and Bucky Barnes / Winter Soldier. It follows the pair as they reluctantly work together to track an anti-nationalist organization, the Flag Smashers. The episode is set in the Marvel Cinematic Universe (MCU), sharing continuity with the films of the franchise. It was written by Michael Kastelein and directed by Kari Skogland.

Anthony Mackie and Sebastian Stan reprise their respective roles as Sam Wilson and Bucky Barnes from the film series, with Wyatt Russell, Erin Kellyman, Danny Ramirez, and Daniel Brühl also starring. Development began by October 2018, and Skogland joined in May 2019. The episode gives a full introduction to the series' new version of Captain America, John Walker (Russell), with a Good Morning America interview and a drumline rendition of Alan Menken's song "Star Spangled Man" from the film Captain America: The First Avenger (2011). Filming for the episode took place at Pinewood Atlanta Studios in Atlanta, Georgia, with location filming in the Atlanta metropolitan area and in Prague.

"The Star-Spangled Man" was released on the streaming service Disney+ on March 26, 2021. It was well-received, with critics widely praising the episode's racial commentary and dialogue, the chemistry between Mackie and Stan, and the introduction of the comic book character Isaiah Bradley (Carl Lumbly).

Plot 
John Walker appears on Good Morning America as the new Captain America and discusses his desire to live up to Steve Rogers' mantle. Bucky Barnes watches on, disappointed, and soon confronts Sam Wilson about his decision to hand Captain America's shield to the United States government. He decides to come with Wilson as he searches for the Flag Smashers terrorist group.

Wilson and Barnes travel to Munich and find the Flag Smashers smuggling medicine. Wilson identifies a possible hostage, who is revealed to be the group's leader, Karli Morgenthau. With their enhanced abilities, the Flag Smashers quickly overpower Barnes and Wilson until Walker and Lemar Hoskins come to their aid, though the Flag Smashers escape. Walker and Hoskins request Barnes and Wilson join them in aiding the Global Repatriation Council (GRC) to quash the ongoing violent post-Blip revolutions, but they refuse. Meanwhile, Morgenthau receives a threatening text from the mysterious Power Broker.

Traveling to Baltimore, Barnes introduces Wilson to Isaiah Bradley, a veteran super soldier who fought Barnes in the Korean War. Bradley refuses to help them uncover information about additional Super Soldier serums due to being imprisoned and experimented on by the U.S. government and Hydra for 30 years. As the two argue over him keeping the existence of an African-American super-soldier a secret, Wilson is harassed by police and Barnes is arrested for missing a therapy appointment. Barnes is released on bail after Walker and Hoskins intervene. Barnes and Wilson are forced into a therapy session with Barnes' therapist Dr. Raynor.

Walker and Hoskins again ask Barnes and Wilson to work with them, but they refuse once again. Disgruntled, Walker warns the duo to stay out of their way. In Slovakia, the Flag Smashers escape by airplane while one member stays behind to hold off the Power Broker's men. Barnes and Wilson decide to visit an imprisoned Helmut Zemo in Berlin to gather intelligence on the Flag Smashers.

Production

Development 
By October 2018, Marvel Studios was developing a limited series starring Anthony Mackie's Sam Wilson / Falcon and Sebastian Stan's Bucky Barnes / Winter Soldier from the Marvel Cinematic Universe (MCU) films. Malcolm Spellman was hired as head writer of the series, which was announced as The Falcon and the Winter Soldier in April 2019. Spellman modeled the series after buddy films that deal with race, such as 48 Hrs. (1982), The Defiant Ones (1958), Lethal Weapon (1987), and Rush Hour (1998). Kari Skogland was hired to direct the miniseries a month later, and executive produced alongside Spellman and Marvel Studios' Kevin Feige, Louis D'Esposito, Victoria Alonso, and Nate Moore. The second episode was written by Michael Kastelein and is titled "The Star-Spangled Man". It was released on the streaming service Disney+ on March 26, 2021.

Casting 
The episode stars Anthony Mackie as Sam Wilson, Sebastian Stan as Bucky Barnes, Wyatt Russell as John Walker / Captain America, Erin Kellyman as Karli Morgenthau, Danny Ramirez as Joaquin Torres, and Daniel Brühl as Helmut Zemo. Also appearing are Clé Bennett as Lemar Hoskins / Battlestar, Carl Lumbly as Isaiah Bradley, Desmond Chiam, Dani Deetté, and Indya Bussey as the Flag Smashers Dovich, Gigi, and DeeDee, respectively, Renes Rivera as Lennox, Tyler Dean Flores as Diego, Ness Bautista as Matias, Amy Aquino as Dr. Christina Raynor, Elijah Richardson as Eli Bradley, Noah Mills as Nico, Gabrielle Byndloss as Olivia Walker, Mike Ray as Alonso Barber, Neal Kodinsky as Rudy, and Good Morning America journalist Sara Haines as herself.

Filming and visual effects 
Filming took place at Pinewood Atlanta Studios in Atlanta, Georgia, with Skogland directing, and P.J. Dillon serving as cinematographer. Location filming took place in the Atlanta metropolitan area and in Prague. According to Aquino, the therapy scene with Wilson and Barnes was largely improvised between Mackie and Stan. Visual effects for the episode were created by Digital Frontier FX, Tippett Studio, Rodeo FX, QPPE, Cantina Creative, Technicolor VFX, and Trixter.

Music 
The drumline in the episode plays a rendition of the song "Star Spangled Man" by Alan Menken, first heard in Captain America: The First Avenger (2011), which series composer Henry Jackman attributed to Skogland and the series' music supervisor. He described it as a parody. This rendition was included, along with selections from composer Henry Jackman's score for the episode, on the series' Vol. 1 soundtrack album, which was released digitally by Marvel Music and Hollywood Records on April 9, 2021.

Marketing 
On March 19, 2021, Marvel announced a series of posters that were created by various artists to correspond with the episodes of the series. The posters were released weekly ahead of each episode, with the second poster, designed by Salvador Anguiano, being revealed on March 22. After the episode's release, Marvel announced merchandise inspired by the episode as part of its weekly "Marvel Must Haves" promotion for each episode of the series, including apparel, accessories, and collectibles which included a Funko Pop and Marvel Legends figure of Walker and a Hot Toys Winter Soldier figure.

Reception

Audience viewership 
Nielsen Media Research, who measure the number of minutes watched by United States audiences on television sets, listed The Falcon and the Winter Soldier as the most-watched original series across streaming services for the week of March 22 to 28, 2021. Between the first two episodes, which were available at the time, the series had 628 million minutes viewed, which was a 27% gain over the previous week.

Critical response 
The review aggregator website Rotten Tomatoes reported a 100% approval rating with an average score of 8.1/10 based on 37 reviews. The site's critical consensus reads, "New political intrigue and a healthy dose of emotional stakes are great, but what really makes 'The Star-Spangled Man' sing is the return of Anthony Mackie and Sebastian Stan's delightfully antagonistic chemistry."

Sulagna Misra of The A.V. Club was amazed how the series was "leading us to how Sam can become Captain America. It's clear that it's not a problem of nerve or intelligence or compassion. It's that Sam feels there is no easy way to go into the role without feeling like an imposter—or even worse, being treated as one." She was relieved that Wilson was an emotionally intelligent main character, and enjoyed the banter between him and Barnes. Misra also felt Lumbly was able to convey a lot in his short scene, and gave the episode an "A". Den of Geeks Gavin Jasper felt the series found its footing in this episode and was "walking into an interesting conflict. As our heroes reluctantly work together, they're sandwiched between a country that mistreats them and a group of terrorists who want to do away with the systems that mistreat our heroes." Jasper called the scene with Isaiah Bradley a memorable, though somber, moment of the episode. He gave the episode 4.5 out of 5 stars. Giving the episode a "B", Christian Holub of Entertainment Weekly believed it was a good choice to explore Walker in the opening of the episode and praised the scene with Isaiah Bradley. Holub enjoyed seeing the Flag Smashers expand upon the idea that there were some benefits to the Blip and compared the group to the Red Lotus from the animated series The Legend of Korra. Speaking to the episode's main set piece, Holub said it was less impressive that the first episode's opening sequence, but made up for its smaller scale by adding more characters to the fight. He was also excited by the continued teasing of the Young Avengers forming in the MCU, as seen in other MCU films and television series, with the appearance of Eli Bradley who becomes Patriot in the comics.

Feeling "The Star-Spangled Man" dove "headfirst into its story" with the episode giving more time to the Flag Smashers and John Walker after the first episode was "highly character-focused", IGNs Matt Purslow said the episode was "another dense, chewy episode, marred only by an odd approach to Sam and Bucky's antagonistic [quippy] dialogue" which came off as "irritating rather than funny". Purslow felt having the action sequence centered on super soldiers "neatly ties it all into the Captain America mythos that runs through the show" and spoke highly of the scene with Isaiah Bradley. He felt that scene was a huge moment for Wilson and said it was "a good sign that the writing team intends to continue exploring the issue in a serious way that is smartly woven into the larger-than-life world of superheroes". He gave the episode an 8 out of 10. Alan Sepinwall at Rolling Stone said the episode was "even busier" than the previous one, but found it to be more satisfying given Wilson and Barnes share scenes which "significantly boosts the energy level of the show and injects some badly-needed humor". Wilson and Barnes' counseling session was one of the highlights for Sepinwall along with the various running gags throughout, though he did criticize the episode's set piece for being repetitive and having what he felt were questionable visual effects.

References

External links 
 
 Episode recap at Marvel.com

2021 American television episodes
The Falcon and the Winter Soldier episodes
Slovakia in fiction
Television episodes set in Baltimore
Television episodes set in Georgia (U.S. state)
Television episodes set in Germany
Television episodes about racism
Television episodes set in the 2020s